Fourways Farm is a 1994–1996 British children's stop-motion animated television series produced by Case Television and Dutch Education Television from the Netherlands, and aired on Channel 4 UK during Channel 4 Schools between 1994 and 1996 and regularly repeated up until 2007.

Plot
Nine talking animals (all voiced by Martin Jarvis in the United Kingdom) live together in Fourways Farm. In every episode, 1 or more of the animals make an accidental but interesting scientific discovery. At nightfall daily, the animals try to deduce a logical explanation for it as they prepare to go to sleep; it happens in most of the episodes. Often, the 3 rats, Uno, Duo and Trio, make mischievous attempts to get some food out of the animals during the series, but they occasionally put their mischief aside to help out whenever there is trouble afoot. In the first 9 episodes, the farm animals say "Good Night" to each other, but in the other 16 episodes, only the closing theme tune is used, as the end credits roll on screen.

Characters
 Davenport the Dog - Has black and white fur and pointy ears, and speaks with an excitable, posh, male voice.
 Martha the Cow - Has brown fur and udders, speaks in a female voice and mulls over situations.
 Godfrey the Horse - Has a blue roan coat, and prides himself on his talents. He speaks with a Yorkshire accent.
 Ginger the Cat - Has red and white ginger fur and speaks with a posh Edinburgh accent.
 Dudley the Pig - Tends to waddle like a penguin whenever he trots and likes to eat turnips. He speaks with a West Country accent.
 Brenda the Duck - Has white feathers and speaks rather loudly, with a Scottish accent.
 Uno the Large Rat - Has brown fur, always wears sunglasses, does most of the scheming, and is a cockney, just like Duo and Trio.
 Duo the Medium Rat - Has brown fur, buck teeth stick out of his mouth, is not very bright, and speaks in a deep voice. 
 Trio the Small Rat - Has buff coloured fur and a pink nose, like Uno and Duo, and speaks in a high-pitched voice.
 Voltaire the Weathercock - The narrator with gold metalwork who can mostly be seen on top of the farm's archway. He speaks in Received Pronunciation.

Episodes

VHS Tape Releases

References

 http://shop.channel4learning.com/?page=shop&cid=14&pid=1642
 http://www.r-e-m.co.uk/rem/xrem.php?T=28911
 http://www.abc.net.au/abckids/shows/prog226.htm

1993 British television series debuts
1995 British television series endings
1990s British children's television series
Fictional farms
British children's animated comedy television series
British stop-motion animated television series
British children's animated fantasy television series
Channel 4 original programming
Peabody Award-winning television programs
1990s British animated television series